Sir Christopher Boyd William Magnay, 3rd Baronet,  (27 March 1884 – 4 September 1960) was an English cricketer who played first-class cricket for Cambridge University in 1904, for Marylebone Cricket Club (MCC) from 1906 to 1909 and for Middlesex from 1906 to 1911.

Magnay was born at Marylebone, London, the son of Sir William Magnay, 2nd Baronet. He was educated at Harrow School and Pembroke College, Cambridge. He played two matches for Cambridge University in 1904. In 1906 he began playing for MCC and also appeared for WG Grace's XI that summer. He made his debut for Middlesex in June 1906 against Sussex. His next match for Middlesex was in 1908 against Gentlemen of Philadelphia. His third and final match for Middlesex was in 1911 against MCC. All his remaining matches were for MCC.

Magnay was a right-handed batsman and played 21 innings in 12 first-class matches at an average of 14.66 and a top score of 73. He bowled one over in the first-class game and took no wickets.

He was also a member at Brokenhurst Manor Golf Club in the New Forest, and won the 1924 Hampshire, Isle of Wight and Channel Islands Amateur Championship, at Southampton's Stoneham Golf Club.

In October 1914 Magnay became lieutenant in the Norfolk Regiment. He served in the First World War, was awarded the Military Cross and reached the rank of major. He succeeded to the baronetcy on the death of his father in 1917. In 1935 he was appointed High Sheriff of Suffolk for 1935-36 and in 1937 he was appointed Deputy Lieutenant of Suffolk.

Magnay lived at Saxham Hall, Great Saxham, Suffolk, where he died in 1960  at the age of 76.

In 1925 Magnay married Winifred Madeline Leigh, daughter of Arthur Frederick Jeffreys and widow of Major Chandos Leigh. They had no children and the baronetcy became extinct on his death.

Arms

References

External links

1884 births
1960 deaths
People educated at Harrow School
Alumni of Pembroke College, Cambridge
Middlesex cricketers
Cambridge University cricketers
Marylebone Cricket Club cricketers
Suffolk cricketers
English cricketers
Baronets in the Baronetage of the United Kingdom
Deputy Lieutenants of Suffolk
High Sheriffs of Suffolk
Recipients of the Military Cross
British Army personnel of World War I
People from Marylebone
Cricketers from Greater London
Royal Norfolk Regiment officers
W. G. Grace's XI cricketers